Old Fort, also known as Missouri Archaeological Survey Number 23SA104, is a historic archaeological site located at Van Meter State Park near Miami, Saline County, Missouri. It was first identified in 1879.  It is an earthwork embankment dating to the period just before and/or during contact with the first Euro-American explorers.

It was added to the National Register of Historic Places in 1972.

References

Archaeological sites on the National Register of Historic Places in Missouri
Buildings and structures in Saline County, Missouri
National Register of Historic Places in Saline County, Missouri